Robert 'Bert' Thomson (born 1927) is a Scottish international lawn bowler.

Bowls career
He competed in the first World Bowls Championship in Kyeemagh, New South Wales, Australia in 1966  and won a bronze medal in the fours with Willie Adrain, Willie Dyet and Harry Reston at the event. He also won a silver medal in the team event (Leonard Trophy).

References

1927 births
Possibly living people
Scottish male bowls players